KQLB 106.9 FM is a radio station licensed to Los Banos in the San Joaquin Valley and Merced County, California.

The station broadcasts a Regional Mexican format and is owned by VLB Broadcasting, Inc.

References

External links
KQLB's official website

QLB
Los Banos, California
Mass media in Merced County, California
QLB